Eve Zaremba (born 1930 in Kalisz, Poland) is a Canadian mystery writer. She has published several novels focusing on Helen Keremos, a private detective who has been described the first lesbian character in literary history to be the main character in an ongoing series of mystery novels.

Life and career
Born in Poland, Zaremba moved to the United Kingdom with her family at the start of World War II, spending the remainder of her childhood in Scotland and England. She later emigrated to Canada in 1952, and graduated from the University of Toronto in 1963.

Zeremba's first Helen Keremos novel, A Reason to Kill, was published in 1978 by Paperjacks. At the time, it received little attention except for a feature in The Body Politic. Zaremba wrote five more books in the series. In 2019 Zaremba announced that a graphic novel adaptation of her second novel, Work for a Million, was expected to be published by Bedside Press in 2020.

In addition to her writing, Zaremba was a co-founder of Broadside, A Feminist Review, one of Canada's first major lesbian publications, and of the Lesbian Organization of Toronto. She has also worked in advertising, marketing, real estate and publishing, as well as owning a used book store.

Works

Novels
A Reason to Kill (1978)
Work for a Million (1986)
Beyond Hope (1987)
Uneasy Lies (1990)
The Butterfly Effect (1994)
White Noise (1997)

Non-fiction
Privilege of Sex: A Century of Canadian Women (1972)

References

1930 births
Canadian mystery writers
Canadian women novelists
Canadian lesbian writers
Polish LGBT novelists
Polish emigrants to Canada
Women mystery writers
Living people
People from Kalisz
20th-century Canadian novelists
Canadian LGBT novelists
20th-century Canadian women writers
University of Toronto alumni
Polish mystery writers
Lesbian novelists
20th-century Canadian LGBT people